Tim Dry (born 9 January 1952) is a mime artist, writer, photographic artist, musician and actor, best known for appearing in Return of the Jedi and the cult sci-fi/horror film Xtro. Tim was a member of the duo Tik and Tok, that popularised robotic mime in the UK in the 1980s.

Early years
Tim Dry was born in Redhill, Surrey, in 1952. After leaving a Graphic Design Dip AD course at Reigate School of Art and Design in 1972, he moved to Brighton, Sussex to explore other areas of creativity, including painting, fine art and producing, along with other Reigate Art School alumni, The Cosmic Colouring Book which was published to acclaim in 1973.

In 1976, he relocated to London to train in mime and physical theatre with Desmond Jones and Lindsay Kemp (who tutored Kate Bush and David Bowie, amongst others).

The-eighties
After three years of intensive stage work (both in solo and duo shows, and as a member of Jones' company 'Silents') Tim, alongside fellow mime partner Barbie Wilde, formed SHOCK: a rock/mime/burlesque/music troupe with Robert Pereno, Carole Caplin, LA Richards and Sean Crawford. SHOCK performed extensively in the burgeoning New Romantic club scene in London in the early 1980s. The first SHOCK single on RCA Records, 'Angel Face', (co-produced by Rusty Egan from Visage and Richard James Burgess from Landscape) was a modest dance floor hit in clubs all over the UK and in New York. SHOCK continued to play at the Blitz Club, The Venue, the Playboy Club, The Embassy Club, The Lyceum, and 'The People's Palace' performance at the Rainbow Theatre. They supported Gary Numan for three nights at his 'Farewell' concerts at Wembley Arena in April 1981. Reduced to a four-piece ensemble after the abrupt departure of Robert and LA in June 1981, SHOCK released a second single, 'Dynamo Beat', on RCA, which again was a dance floor hit in UK clubs, but failed to chart nationwide.

Tik and Tok
In early 1982 Tim and Sean left Shock to pursue their own vision of a combination of mime, visual image and music, creating a duo called Tik and Tok. Signed to Indie label Survival Records, they released 5 singles and an album 'Intolerance' in the UK, Europe and Japan. Their second single 'Cool Running' reached No.69 in the UK Top 70 Singles Chart (The Guinness Book of British Hit Singles).

In 1982, Tik and Tok were cast as featured creatures in two roles each in Star Wars Episode VI: Return of the Jedi. The same year also saw them appear in the cult sci-fi/horror film Xtro. Tim played The Monster and Sean played The Commando.

Tik and Tok supported Duran Duran on their sell-out UK tour of 1982 and Gary Numan on his comeback UK 'Warriors' tour in 1983. They appeared on 23 TV shows, including The Royal Variety Performance in front of HRH Queen Elizabeth II and the cult music program The Tube, hosted by Jools Holland and Paula Yates.

Tik & Tok reformed briefly in 2005, creating a new album, Dream Orphans, in which Tim wrote, played and produced all the songs. Tim and Sean appear regularly at 'Star Wars' autograph conventions worldwide.

Photographic work
Tim is a photographic artist, whose subjects have included Mick Jagger, Steven Berkoff, composer Georg Kajanus, Mediæval Bæbes, writer Rupert Thomson and Joan Collins.

His work has been commissioned as CD covers, illustrative articles and book jackets for clients including James McCarraher's 'Office Haunting', Atlantic Records, Cosmopolitan magazine, Black Lace Publishing, Simon & Schuster, Virgin Records, WEA and Hot Shoe magazine.

His photographic collages have been exhibited at The National Portrait Gallery, The Royal Photographic Society, The Association of Photographers Gallery in London and in Bath, Hamburg, and Berlin, as well as at the Christmas 2007, 2008, 2009 and 2010 shows at the prestigious Gallery 286 in West London. In March 2009 he showed one portrait at an exhibition at The Arts Club in London.

Acting
Tim acted in more than 90 TV commercials in the UK and Europe. He had featured roles in the US-UK co-production of the TV series The 10th Kingdom, in films such as Soup, Death Wish 3, Revolution and Decadence, and UK TV shows including The Bill, EastEnders, Casualty, Dempsey and Makepeace, Goodbye Mr Steadman and Father Ted. On stage he played the lead in Steven Berkoff's Harry's Christmas and Molière's School For Wives, Satan in Adam Redundant and The Lecturer in John Bowen's After The Rain.

In October 2010 Tim starred in the titular role in the short horror/comedy movie"SON of Nosferatu. Written and directed by David Rose, it was released in 2011. Tim has a featured role in the feature-length movie "Le Accelerator" and he co-stars in the film short Pier Pressure released in Autumn 2014.In 2020 Tim played the character Ezekiel Petrov in Episode 5 'Dad'of the horror series 'Dark Ditties' for Amazon Prime.

Noir
In 1996, alongside singer-songwriter Georg Kajanus from the band Sailor, he co-created the poetic/techno music duo called NOIR. Their song 'Walking' was used as a motif in four episodes of the Channel 4 food and drink series 'FEAST' in 1997, which was directed by David Pritchard (of Rick Stein and Keith Floyd fame) and also starred TV chef Jean-Christophe Novelli. Noir also presented 'Feast' and wrote the theme tune. The video for the 'Walking' single, released on Koch Records in the UK, was shown on Top of the Pops 2 and Live and Kicking. Their self-produced album, 'Strange Desire', was re-released by Angel Air Records in 2007.

Writer and songwriter
Tim is the author of two published books of memoirs:Falling Upwards – Scenes From A life  and Continuum – The Star Wars Phenomenon As Experienced From The Inside. His first novella, entitled Ricochet was released in January 2018 by Azoth Khem Publishing. He also has short stories in three Horror anthologies published by Western Legends Press. Namely:O is for Onokentaura in The Bestiarum Vocabulum, N is for Nostophobia in Phobophobias and A is for Annis in The Grimorium Verum. Lycopolis Press published his story Interview With Nybbas in their anthology Demonology in 2015. All of which were compiled and edited by Dean M Drinkel. The 2016 anthology of poems and short stories influenced by the life and work of the late David Bowie entitled 47 – 16 featured Tim's story Inside. Tim's tale Leo was published in the anthology The Thirteen Signs, published by again edited by Dean M Drinkel, in 2016. A story by Tim entitled The Fall can be found in Whirling World anthology of industrial horror. Christmas 2017 saw the publication of Tim's story Nine Ladies Dancing in the anthology 12 Dark days. Tim has also contributed articles for Forbes magazine, Film Review annual and Film Rage magazine. He wrote the text for the illustrated book Detroit Rising that is to be made into a feature-length movie in 2017.

From 2008 to 2011 Tim was collaborating with guitarist Mo Blackford (LIGOTAGE and NASA) under the name TIMANDMO, creating music that can best be described as 'Organic Electronica'.

A limited edition double CD of previously unreleased solo recordings entitled Retroject was released on June 28, 2022.

Discography
TIM DRY
Album:
'Retroject'. Self-Released 2022.

SHOCK
Singles:
'Angel Face'. b/w 'R.E.R.B'. RCA Records 1980.
'Dynamo Beat'. b/w 'Dream Games'. RCA Records 1981.

TIK AND TOK
Singles:
'Summer In The City'. b/w 'Crisis'. Survival Records 1982.
'Cool Running'. b/w 'Vile Bodies'. Survival Records 1983.
'Screen Me, I'm Yours'. b/w 'Dangerous and Unafraid'. Survival Records 1984.
'Everything Will Change'. b/w 'Cracking Up'. Survival Records 1984.
'Higher Ground'. b/w 'Down From The Sky'. Survival Records 1984.
Albums:
'Intolerance'. Survival Records 1984.
'Dream Orphans'. Self-Released 2007.
Compilation
'Definitive'. Self-Released 2019.
EPs:
Tik & Tok EP Rephlex label 2004.
'Slightly Deranged' EP Self-Released 2006.
'Intolerance Xtras' EP Self-Released 2006.
'Vintage Lo-Fi' EP Self-Released 2006.
Compilations (featuring):
Survival Dance Report SUR LP 007. 'Summer In The City' and 'Cool Running'. 1983
The Art Of Survival LP SUR LP OO9 'Screen Me, I'm Yours' and 'Higher Ground'. 1984.
Jet Set – Sounds Of Lust & Luxury CD 0927 454422. 'Crisis'. 2002
DJ-Kicks: Chicken Lips CD K7155CD. 'Crisis'. 2003
Intergalactic Sunrise (XL Version) PR-009. 'Cool Running'. 2006

THE WANG BROTHERS
Single:
'While My Guitar Gently Weeps' (George Harrison) b/w 'Wango!' (co-writer). Communiqué Records 1985.

BEKI BONDAGE (co-writer)
Singles:
'Don't Turn Away' b/w 'Hard To Get'. Communiqué Records 1985.
'Out Of The Darkness'. b/w 'You Got It Made'. Communiqué Records 1985.

NASA (co-writer)
Album: 'Insha – Allah'. Sire Records 1990.
'Burning Gold'.

NOIR
Single:
'Walking'. Koch Records 1997.
Album:
'Strange Desire'. Angel Air Records 2007.

TIMANDMO:
Digital album:
'Happy Accidents' 2011.

References

 "Duran Duran – Notorious" by Steve Malins. Andre Deutsch 2005..
 "Praying to the Aliens" by Gary Numan and Steve Malins. Andre Deutsch 1997.
 "The Cosmic Colouring Book". Mushroom Cloud Publishing Co Ltd. 1973. 
 "Falling Upwards – Scenes From A Life" by Tim Dry. Bear Claw Books. 2013. 
 "The Bestiarum Vocabulum". Edited by Dean M Drinkel. 2013. 
 "Continuum – The Star Wars Phenomenon As Experienced From The Inside" by Tim Dry. 2012. BookBaby. ASIN:B007XIZMD2

External links

 
 https://www.youtube.com/user/TIMDRY
 https://www.spotlight.com/interactive/cv/9859-6721-4699

English male film actors
Living people
People from Redhill, Surrey
1952 births